Kerry Kathleen Fitzpatrick (born 1 October 1947) known as Kate Fitzpatrick, is an Australian television, film, and theatre actress.

Early years
Kate grew up in the Adelaide suburb of Dover Gardens, and it was in Adelaide that her love for classical music, art and cricket developed. A highlight of her early years was being selected by Jeffrey Smart ("Phidias" of the Argonauts Club) for a travelling art scholarship to Japan. At the age of 18 she was accepted as a drama student by NIDA and moved to Sydney.

Career
Theatre roles include The Lady of the Camellias, Hamlet, Celluloid Heroes, The Ride Across Lake Constance, Shadows of Blood, Rooted, Kennedy's Children. With the Old Tote Theatre Company she acted in The Legend of King O'Malley, The Season at Sarsparilla, The Misanthrope, The Threepenny Opera, and Big Toys by Patrick White, who wrote the play for Fitzpatrick. She acted in Visions for the Paris Theatre Company, and in The Recruiting Officer for the Melbourne Theatre Company. She played Magenta in the original Australian production of The Rocky Horror Show in 1974. Her latest appearance (May 2014) was with Sydney's Ensemble Theatre in the David Williamson play Cruise Control.

Fitzpatrick's  film roles included appearances in Homesdale (1971), The Office Picnic (1972), Promised Woman (1975), The Great Macarthy (1975), The Removalists (1975), The Night Nurse (1977), Goodbye Paradise (1983), The Return of Captain Invincible (1983) and A World Apart (1988). Her television series appearances include Serpent in the Rainbow, Birds in the Bush, Boney, Something in the Air, Scooter: Secret Agent, Blue Heelers, Marshall Law, Always Greener, and All Saints. In 2006, Fitzpatrick briefly joined the cast of soap opera Neighbours in the role of Loris Timmins. In 2009, Fitzpatrick appeared in Packed to the Rafters in a reprising guest role. In 2010, Fitzpatrick did a short film called Stay Awake and also appeared on Satisfaction.

In 1983, Fitzpatrick became the world's first female cricketing commentator on television, when she joined the Nine Network cricket commentating team, a gamble by Channel Nine to add a more female approach to the game and attract a larger audience. Allegedly, Fitzpatrick was not welcomed with open arms by the (until then) male bastion of cricket commentators, according to Angela Pippos. Nine's tactical move, in placing a female in a cricket commentator role, was not successful and Fitzpatrick didn't return for the following season.

Fitzpatrick is a published author, essayist, and humourist whose work has appeared in numerous major newspapers and journals over the last 30 years. Fitzpatrick has also worked as a political speech writer during the 1990s.

Recognition 
She also has been awarded the Queen's "Silver Jubilee Medal" for services to the theatre on the Britannia and has recently completed an Arts degree from National Institute of Dramatic Art.

Personal life 
Fitzpatrick has a son named Joe Fitzpatrick with French architect José Albertini. Joe, an Australian commercial real estate professional, is well known in Sydney social circles.

Filmography

Film

Television

Bibliography

References

External links
 

Australian television actresses
Actresses from Perth, Western Australia
Living people
1947 births
National Institute of Dramatic Art alumni